Mariano Fernández may refer to:

 (1718–1789), Mexican writer, philosopher and historian; see Lorenzo Boturini Benaduci
Mariano Fernández (Chile) (born 1945), Chilean politician and diplomat
Mariano Fernández Bermejo (born 1948), Spanish politician and jurist
Mariano Fernández (footballer, born 1978), Argentine defender for Club Atlético Lanús
Mariano Fernández (footballer, born 1988), Argentine defender for Club Agropecuario Argentino
Mariano Fernández (politician), vice-governor of La Pampa Province, Argentina